MV Cygnet was a  by  motor launch that provided ferry and freight service on Skaha Lake in British Columbia, Canada. She was built by Summerland Boat Works in 1911 for the South Okanagan Transportation Company, owned by James Fraser Campbell and A. S. Hatfield, to replace the tug Kaleden. Cygnet had a Fairbanks marine engine that was started by turning the flywheel with a steel bar that fitted into sockets in the wheel. In the early 1920s, she was moved to Okanagan Lake to carry fruit to Kelowna, British Columbia for a summer before she was sold in Kelowna.

References

History of British Columbia
Culture of the Okanagan